Aruba participated in the 2019 Parapan American Games. They sent the same size delegation as the previous games.

Competitors
The following table lists Aruba's delegation per sport and gender.

Taekwondo

References

2019 in Aruban sport
Aruba at the Pan American Games
Nations at the 2019 Parapan American Games